The MotorWeek Drivers’ Choice Awards are one of the many yearly Car of the Year awards. This one is given by MotorWeek, an American television automotive magazine series.

Since 1983, MotorWeek has presented its Drivers’ Choice Awards which are among the auto industry’s most prestigious honors. The Drivers’ Choice Awards provide a consumer focus and represent a list of best automotive picks in the most popular vehicle categories, including the  “Best of the Year” award. They are presented annually in February during the Chicago Auto Show.

Categories
As of 2011, the categories are:

 Best of the Year
 Best Small Car
 Best Family Sedan
 Best Sport Sedan
 Best Luxury Sedan
 Best Convertible
 Best Small Utility
 Best Large Utility
 Best Pickup Truck
 Best Minivan
 Best Sport Coupe
 Best Performance Car
 Best Eco-Friendly
 Best Dream Machine

Until 1998, some categories were separated into imports and domestics. Various name and category changes happened as well through the years.

Drivers' Choice Awards Winners

Best of the Year Winners by Manufacturer

See also

 List of motor vehicle awards

References

External links
 MotorWeek home page
 

Automotive television series
Motor vehicle awards